Munawar Sultana (Punjabi) was a Pakistani radio and film singer. She is known for vocalizing first ever hit Lollywood songs like, "Mainu Rab Di Soun Tere Naal Piyar Ho Gya" (Film: Pheray 1949), "Wastae Rab Da Tu Jaanvi We Kabootra" (Film:Dulla Bhatti 1956),and "Ae Qaid-e-Azam, Tera Ehsan Hay, Ehsan" (Film: Bedari 1957).

Early life
Sultana was born in Ludhiyana, British India on November 8, 1924.

Career
Sultana started her career in the 1940s as a radio singer. She received her early music education from a composer Abdul Haq Shami. Her debut film as a playback singer was "Teri Yaad", which was also the first movie of Lollywood, released in 1948. She sang for both Urdu and Punjabi movies and recorded 181 songs for 54 films. She had the credit of vocalising film songs that became popular among the public in the earlier decade of a young Lollywood. Apart from playback singing, Sultana also recorded many semi-classical songs for Radio Pakistan.

Personal life
Sultana was married to Ayub Romani who was a station director at Radio Pakistan, Lahore. She resigned from singing after her marriage, and committed herself to a domestic life and social welfare activities.

Popular songs

Film
 Menu Rabb Di Sohn Teray Naal Pyar Ho Geya Way ... 1949 (Film: Pheray - Punjabi), Music: G.A. Chishti, Poet: G.A. Chishti
 Way Akhian Lavin Na, Tay Fer Pachhtavin Na ... 1949 (Film: Pheray - Punjabi), Singer(s): Munawar Sultana, Inayat Hussain Bhatti, Music: G.A. Chishti, Poet: G.A. Chishti
 Teray Long Da Peya Lashaka, Halian Nay Hall Dhak Lay ... 1950 (Film: Laray - Punjabi), Singer(s): Inayat Hussain Bhatti, Munawar Sultana, Music: G.A. Chishti
 Way Main Bol Bol Thakki, Teinu Tol Tol Takhi ... 1950 (Film: Laray - Punjabi), Singer(s): Munawar Sultana, Music: G.A. Chishti, Poet: G.A. Chishti
 Raj Dularay, Phoolon Ki Seij Pay Tujh Ko Salaun ...	1955 (Film: Noukar - Urdu), Singer(s): Munawar Sultana, Music: G.A. Chishti, Poet: Qateel Shafai
 Baddal Nu Hath Lawan, Tay Uddi Uddi Jawan, Hawa Day Naal ... 1955 (Film: Heer- Punjabi), Singer(s): Munawar Sultana & Co., Music: Safdar Hussain, Poet: Hazin Qadri
 Wasta e Rabb Da, Tu Javin Way Kabootra ... 1956 (Film: Dulla Bhatti - Punjabi), Singer(s): Munawar Sultana, Music: G.A. Chishti, Poet: Tufail Hoshiarpuri
 O Dilla Kachya, Qarar Day Pakya, Kissay Day Naal Gall Na Karin ... 1956 (Film: Guddi Gudda - Punjabi), Singer(s): Munawar Sultana, Music: G.A. Chishti, Poet: Wali Sahib
 Ae Qaid-e-Azam, Tera Ehsan Hay, Ehsan ... 1957 (Film: Bedari - Urdu), Singer(s): Munawar Sultana & Co., Music: Fateh Ali Khan, Poet: Khawar Zaman

Radio
 Main Aarzoo e Jaan Likhon Ya Jaan e Aarzoo, Poet: Akhtar Sheerani
 Chand Roshan Chamakta Sitara Rahe
 Sada Chirriyan Da Chamba We Babul Asan Udd Jana

Death
Munawar Sultana died on 7 June  1995 in Lahore.

References

External links

Pakistani playback singers
1995 deaths
1924 births
Musicians from Ludhiana
Pakistani radio personalities
Punjabi people
20th-century Pakistani women singers